The 1963–64 Kansas State Wildcats men's basketball team represented Kansas State University as a member of the Big 8 Conference during the 1963–64 NCAA University Division men's basketball season. The head coach was Tex Winter, innovator of the Triangle offense and future member of the Basketball Hall of Fame, who was in his 11th year at the helm.  The Wildcats finished with a record of 22–7 (12–2 Big 8), and reached the Final Four.

The team played its home games at Ahearn Field House in Manhattan, Kansas.

Roster

|-
!colspan=6 style=| Big Eight Regular season

|-
!colspan=6 style=| NCAA Tournament

Rankings

References

Kansas State
Kansas State
NCAA Division I men's basketball tournament Final Four seasons
Kansas State Wildcats men's basketball seasons
1963 in sports in Kansas
1964 in sports in Kansas